Rabbi Prof. Brikha H. S. Nasoraia (full name: Brikha Hathem Saed Naṣoraia; born 1964 in Iraq) is a Mandaean priest and scholar based in Sydney, Australia. He is affiliated with the University of Sydney and Mardin Artuklu University. He is currently a professor of Comparative Semitics, Literature and Art History.

Early life and education
Brikha Nasoraia was born in Iraq to Mahdi Saed (father) and Layla (mother). He was ordained as a ganzibra (Mandaean high priest) and later emigrated to Sydney, Australia. In 2005, he obtained a Ph.D. degree from the University of Sydney, where he wrote his doctoral dissertation on the translation and analysis of the Dmut Kušṭa scroll.

Career
As a ganzibra (head priest), he is currently the President of the Mandaean Spiritual Council (or the Mandaean Nasoraean Supreme Council) of Australia and is also the President of the International Mandaean Nasoraean Supreme Council (or Nasoraean Mandaean Association).

Nasoraia lectures at the University of Sydney, and also at Mardin Artuklu University in Mardin, Turkey.

Brikha Nasoraia's research interests include archaeology (particularly Mandaic lead rolls and incantation bowls), philosophy of religion, and translation of Mandaic manuscripts. He has participated in excavations at archaeological sites such as Harran.

He is fluent in English, Arabic, and Aramaic. Nasoraia is also an artist who produces oil paintings featuring Mandaean religious themes.

Personal life
He is married to Nadia al-Faris, with whom he has three children.

Selected publications
Below is a partial list of publications by Brikha Nasoraia.

Note that in earlier works, he is cited as Hathem Saed Naṣoraia. Brikha is a title that was later added to his name as cited in academic literature, Hathem is his given name, Mahdi is his father's name, and Saed is his grandfather's name. Naṣoraia is used to denote that he is a Nasoraean, i.e. a Mandaean priest. (See also Mandaean name.)

Books
Nasoraia, Brikha (2022). Masbuta: The Mandaean Baptism (forthcoming). Belgium: Brepols Publishers.


Book chapters

Journal articles

Nasoraia, B., Trompf, G. (2011). Mandaean Macrohistory. ARAM Periodical, 22(2010), 391-425. 
Trompf, G., Nasoraia, B. (2011). Reflecting on the 'Rivers Scroll'. ARAM Periodical, 22(2010), 61-86. 
Crangle, E., Nasoraia, B. (2010). Soul Food: The Mandaean Laufani. ARAM Periodical, 22, 97-132.
Nasoraia, B., Crangle, E. (2010). The Asuta wish: Adam Kasia and the Dynamics of Healing in Mandaean Contemplative Praxis. ARAM Periodical, 22, 349-390.

References

External links
Interview from The Worlds of Mandaean Priests
Lecture at Mardin Artuklu University
Lecture at Nanhua University

1964 births
Living people
Iraqi emigrants to Australia
Iraqi Mandaeans
Mandaean priests
Religious studies scholars
Scholars of Mandaeism
Translators from Mandaic
Academic staff of the University of Sydney
Academic staff of Mardin Artuklu University
Clergy from Sydney
Australian people of Iraqi descent